The Magnitude of All Things is a Canadian documentary film, directed by Jennifer Abbott and released in 2020. The film explores the concept of environmental grief, through the lens of connecting Abbott's emotional reaction to the death of her sister Saille from cancer to her emotional reactions to climate change.

The film premiered at the 2020 Vancouver International Film Festival. It was subsequently screened at the 2020 Planet in Focus environmental film festival, where it won the award for Best Canadian Feature.

The film was shortlisted for the Vancouver Film Critics Circle award for Best Canadian Documentary at the Vancouver Film Critics Circle Awards 2020. The film received Canadian Screen Award nominations for Best Cinematography in a Documentary (Vince Arvidson) and Best Editing in a Documentary (Abbott) at the 10th Canadian Screen Awards in 2022.

References

External links

The Magnitude of All Things at Library and Archives Canada

2020 films
2020 documentary films
Canadian documentary films
National Film Board of Canada documentaries
Documentary films about environmental issues
Films about grieving
Films directed by Jennifer Abbott
2020s English-language films
2020s Canadian films